Anna of Brandenburg (1 January 1507 – June 19, 1567 in Lübz) was a Duchess consort of Mecklenburg.

Life 
Anna was the eldest daughter of the Elector Joachim I of Brandenburg (1484–1535) from his marriage to Elizabeth (1485–1555), daughter of King Johann of Denmark.

She married on 17 January 1524, in Berlin with Duke Albert VII of Mecklenburg (1486–1547).  She brought a dowry of  into the marriage, and in return received as her jointure the city and district of Lübz and the district of Crivitz.

After her husband's death in 1547, she took up residence at the Eldenburg in her widow seat of Lübz.

Anna died in 1567. In her will, dated 25 March 1557, John Albert I had her buried in Schwerin Cathedral.

Issue 
From her marriage Anna had the following children:
 Magnus (1524-1524)
 John Albert I (1525–1576), Duke of Mecklenburg, married
 in 1555 Princess Anna Sophia of Prussia (1527–1591)
 Ulrich III (1527–1603), Duke of Mecklenburg, married
 in 1556 Princess Elizabeth of Denmark (1524–1586)
 in 1588 Princess Anna of Pomerania-Wolgast (1554–1626)
 George (1528–1552)
 Anna (1533–1602), married
 in 1566 with Gotthard Kettler, Duke of Courland (1517–1587)
 Louis (1535-1535)
 John (1536-1536)
 Christopher (1537–1592), Administrator of Ratzeburg, married
 in 1573 with Princess Dorothea of Denmark (1528–1575)
 in 1581 with Princess Elisabeth of Sweden (1549–1597)
 Sophie (1538-1538)
 Charles I (1540–1610), Duke of Mecklenburg

References 
 Ernst Seraphim: Geschichte Von Livland: 1. Band: Das Livlndische Mittelalter Und Die Zeit Der Reformation, BiblioBazaar, LLC, 2009, p. 212 ff
 Friedrich Ludwig Röper: Geschichte und Anekdoten von Dobberan in Mecklenburg:, self-published, 1808, p. 176

External links 
 http://www.guide2womenleaders.com/womeninpower/Womeninpower1500.htm
 http://www.emecklenburg.de/Niklot/i0128.htm

Footnotes 

16th-century German women
Duchesses of Mecklenburg
House of Hohenzollern
1507 births
1567 deaths
16th-century German people
Burials at Schwerin Cathedral
Daughters of monarchs